Yasmine Ryan (ca. 1983 – 30 November 2017) was a print, television and multimedia journalist from New Zealand. She was involved in covering the Arab Spring for Al Jazeera English. Ryan also created documentaries.

Biography
Yasmine Ryan was educated at the University of Auckland (BA (Honours) in Political Science and French) and Sciences Po Aix (Master's degree in journalism). She worked for Scoop, Al Jazeera English (September 2010 – October 2013) in Doha, The Independent (2015), and as a contributing freelancer for TRT World. She also wrote for the Washington Post, The New York Times, Foreign Policy, and the Los Angeles Times. She also made documentaries for AJ+.

In 2016, she served as a Fellow at the World Press Institute. Ryan died "in conflicted circumstances", in Istanbul, Turkey, on 30 November 2017, at the age of 34.

Awards and honours
 2010, International Award for Excellence in Journalism
 2011, Al Jazeera English team member, winner, Columbia University Graduate School of Journalism's Alfred I duPont award
 2011, Online News Association's Online Journalism Award in the category Breaking News, and General Excellence in Online Journalism

References

2017 deaths
New Zealand journalists
21st-century New Zealand women writers
New Zealand non-fiction writers
New Zealand documentary filmmakers
New Zealand women journalists
University of Auckland alumni
Year of birth uncertain